The Battle of Uhud was a major engagement between early Muslims and the Quraysh during the Muslim-Quraysh War. The battle was fought in a valley north of Mount Uhud near Medina on Saturday, 23 March 625 AD (7 Shawwal, 3 AH), 

The Quraysh, who had suffered a prior defeat at the Battle of Badr, was eager to launch a counter-strike to avenge their losses. Led by chieftain Abu Sufyan ibn Harb, the Quraysh marched against the Muslims in Medina. 

The early phase of the fighting saw the Muslims gaining the initiative. The Quraysh vanguard began faltering and retreated, leaving the their camps vulnerable. However when Muslim victory seemed near, the Muslim rear guard who were tasked to defend a hill to protect against a possible encirclement, abandoned their positions to collect spoils of war left by the fleeing enemy. This turn of events was exploited by the Quraysh general Khalid ibn al-Walid who launched a daring cavalry strike in the undefended rear and encircled the Muslims, thus turning the tide of battle. 

The battle was seen as a significant setback for the Muslims and a minor victory for the Quraysh as they would return with an even larger force in the Battle of the Trench.

Background

The early Muslims were persecuted by the Quraysh in their hometown of Mecca for more than a decade. When divine revelation came to migrate, Muhammad and the Muslims left to settle in Medina in order to escape persecution and construct a community there.

The Muslims and the Quraysh frequently clashed in skirmishes and raids, culminating in the eventful Battle of Badr in March 624. The Meccans were routed with their important leaders killed in battle, including the infamous Amr ibn Hishām. 

When this defeat came, Abu Sufyan was chosen as the successor of the leader of Quraysh. He vowed vengeance, swore a retaliatory raid on the city of Medina itself. Several months later, Abu Sufyan accompanied a party of 200 men to the city, obtaining temporary residence with the chief of Banu Nadir, a Jewish tribe. He began studying Madinah in depth. He and his party then left Madinah, burning houses and laying waste to fields in fulfillment of his vow. 

Further skirmishes between the Meccans and the Muslims would occur thereafter. A few months later, Abu Sufyan mobilized an invasion force of over 3,000 men to retaliate against the Muslims for the losses at Badr.

Battle

Meccan march to Medina

At the head of a 3,000-strong army, Abu Sufyan ibn Harb set forth toward Madinah to avenge the Meccans' defeat at Badr. They encamped on the pastures north of the city, hoping that the Muslims would come out to meet them. According to the early Muslim historian Ibn Ishaq, a number of Meccan women are said to have accompanied Abu Sufyan's army to boost their morale, including Hind bint 'Utbah, Abu Sufyan's wife.

A scout alerted Muhammad of the Meccan army's presence and numbers late on Thursday, 20 December 624. The next morning, a Muslim council-of-war convened, and there was a dispute over how to best repel the Meccans. Muhammad and many of the wise senior figures suggested that it would be safer to fight within Medina and take advantage of its heavily fortified strongholds. Younger Muslims argued that the Meccans were destroying their crops and that huddling in the strongholds would destroy Muslim prestige. Muhammad eventually conceded to the wishes of the latter and readied the Muslim force for battle.

Muslim encampment at Uhud 
A group of approximately 1,000 Muslim men set out northward from Madinah toward Mount Uhud late on Friday, 21 December 624. Early the next morning, they took a position on the lower slopes of the hill of Uhud. Shortly before the battle commenced, 'Abdallah ibn Ubayy, chief of the Khazraj, along with 300 other men, withdrew their support for Muhammad and returned to Medina, with reports suggesting Ibn Ubayy's discontent with the plan to march out from Medina to meet the Meccans. Ibn Ubayy and his followers would later receive censure in the Qur'an for this act.

The Muslim force, now numbering around 700 encamped on the slopes of Uhud, facing Madinah, with their back protected by the mountain. Before the battle, Muhammad had assigned 50 archers on a nearby rocky hill at the west side of the Muslim camp. This was a strategic decision in order to shield the vulnerable flanks of the outnumbered Muslim army; the archers on the hill were to protect the left flank, while the right flank was to be protected by the Mount of Uhud situated on the east side of the Muslim camp. Protecting the flanks of the Muslim army meant that the Meccan army would not be able to turn around the Muslim camp, and thus the Muslim army wouldn't be surrounded or encircled by the Meccan cavalry, keeping in mind that the Meccan cavalry outnumbered the Muslim cavalry with 50-to-1. Muhammad ordered the Muslim archers to not leave their positions on the hill unless ordered to do so by him, making it clear by uttering these words to the archers, "If you see us prevail and start to take spoils, do not come to assist us. And if you see us get vanquished and birds eat from our heads, do not come to assist us."

The Duels 
The Meccan army positioned itself facing the Muslim lines, with the main body led by Abu Sufyan, and the left and right flanks commanded by Ikrimah ibn Abu Jahl, son of Amr ibn Hishām and Khalid ibn al-Walid, respectively. 'Amr ibn al-'As was commander of the cavalry and his task was to coordinate the attack between the cavalry wings. They attacked with their initial charge led by the Medinan exile Abu ‘Amir. Thwarted by a shower of stones from the Muslims, Abu ‘Amir and his men were forced to retreat to the camps behind the Meccan lines. The Meccan standard-bearer Talhah ibn Abi Talhah al-‘Abdari, advanced and challenged the enemy to a duel. Ali ibn Abi Talib, the cousin of Muhammad, rushed forth and struck Talhah down in a single blow. Talhah's brother, Uthman, ran forward to pick up the fallen banner — the Meccan women willing him on with songs and the loud beating of timbrels. Hamza ibn ‘Abd al-Muttalib emerged from the Muslim ranks, bringing him to a similar fate as Talhah. It was their family that was responsible for the Meccan army's standard-bearing, and thus one by one, Talhah's brothers and sons went to retrieve the Meccan banner and fight unsuccessfully until they all eventually perished. Following the duels, general engagement between the two armies commenced. Meccan confidence quickly began to dissolve as the Muslims swept through their ranks.

Meccan retreat and counter-attack 
The Meccan army was pushed back, and repeated attempts by its cavalry to overrun the left Muslim flank were negated by the Muslim archers. Enjoying the best of these early encounters, the Muslims pierced through the Meccan lines, with victory appearing certain. However, it was the detachment of the Muslim archers, disobeying Muhammad's strict orders to remain stationary, that would shift the outcome of the battle, as most of them ran downhill to join in the advance and despoil the Meccan camp, leaving the flank vulnerable.

At this critical juncture, the Meccan cavalry, led by Khalid ibn al-Walid, exploited this move and attacked the remaining minority of Muslim archers who refused to disobey Muhammad's orders and were still positioned on the hill. From there, the Meccans were then able to target and overrun the Muslim flank and rear. Confusion ensued, and numerous Muslims were killed. The most notable of the killed Muslims was Hamza, who had been thrown down in a surprise attack by the javelin of the Ethiopian slave of Jubayr ibn Mut'im, Wahshi ibn Harb. While the Meccan riposte strengthened, rumors circulated that Muhammad too had perished. It emerged, however, that Muhammad had only been wounded—due to missiles of stone which resulted in a gash on his forehead and lip. It is recorded that 'Ali ibn Abi Talib alone remained, fending off the assaults of Khalid's cavalrymen. According to Ibn Atheer, "The Prophet became the object of the attack of various units of the army of Quraish from all sides. Ali attacked, in compliance with Muhammad's orders, every unit that made an attack upon him and dispersed them or killed some of them, and this thing took place a number of times in Uhud." After fierce hand-to-hand combat, most of the Muslims managed to withdraw and regroup higher up on the slopes of Uhud. A small faction was cut off and tried to make its way back to Medina, though many of these were killed. The Meccans' chief offensive arm, its cavalry, was unable to ascend the slopes of Uhud in pursuit of the Muslims, and so the fighting ceased. Hind and her companions are said to have mutilated the Muslim corpses, cutting off their ears and noses; making them into anklets. Hind is reported to have cut open the corpse of Hamza, taking out his liver which she then attempted to eat. Abu Sufyan, after some brief verbal exchanges with Muhammad's companion, Ibn Ishaq records this exchange as follows:

Abu Sufyan then decided to return to Mecca without pressing his advantage of re-attacking the wounded muslims of Madinah.

The battle is generally believed by scholars to be a defeat for the Muslims, as they had incurred greater losses than the Meccans. Chase F. Robinson, writing in the Encyclopaedia of Islam, states the notion that "the Muslims suffered a disheartening defeat is clear enough." Other scholars such as William Montgomery Watt disagree, noting that while the Muslims did not win, the Meccans had failed to achieve their strategic aim of destroying Muhammad and his followers; and that the Meccans' untimely withdrawal indicated weakness on their part. The battle is also noted for the emergence of the military leadership and stratagem of Khalid ibn al-Walid, who would later become the most famous of all Arab generals during the Islamic expansion era, in conquering the Sassanid Empire and Byzantine-held Syria.

Aftermath

Muhammad and the Muslims buried the dead on the battlefield, returning home that evening. The Meccans retired for the evening at a place called Hamra al-Asad, a few miles away from Medina. The next morning, Muhammad sent out a small force to scout the Meccan army on their way home. According to Watt, this was because Muhammad realized that a show of force was required to speed the Meccans away from the Medinan territory. The Meccans, not wanting to be perceived as being chased away, remained nearby for a few days before leaving.

Muslim reaction
For the Muslims, the battle held a religious dimension as well as a military one. They had expected another victory like at Badr, which was considered a sign of God's favor upon them. At Uhud, however, they had barely held off the invaders and had lost a great many men. A verse of the Qur'an revealed soon after the battle cited the Muslims' disobedience and desire for loot as the cause for this setback:

According to the Qur'an, then, the misfortunes at Uhud — largely the result of the rear guard abandoning their position in order to seek booty — were partly a punishment and partly a test for steadfastness. Firestone observes that such verses provided inspiration and hope to the Muslims, sacralizing future battles that they would experience. He adds that rather than demoralizing the Muslims, the battle seemed to reinforce the solidarity between them.

Further conflict
Abu Sufyan, whose position as leader was no longer disputed, set about forging alliances with surrounding nomadic tribes in order to build up strength for another advance on Medina. The success of the Meccans' rousing of tribes against Muhammad reaped disastrous consequences for him and the Muslims with two main losses: one was where a Muslim party had been invited by a chieftain of the Ma'unah tribe, who were then killed as they approached by the tribe of Sulaym; while the other was when the Muslims had sent out instructors to a tribe which stated it wanted to convert to Islam — the instructors had been led into an ambush by the guides of the would-be Muslim tribe, and were subsequently killed. Soon thereafter, Muhammad became convinced that the Jewish tribe Banu Nadir harbored enmity towards him and were plotting to kill him. The Banu Nadir were expelled from Medina after a fifteen-day siege, with some relocating to the oasis of Khaybar and others to Syria. Abu Sufyan, along with the allied confederate tribes, would attack Medina in the Battle of the Trench, two years after the events at Uhud (in 627).

Islamic primary sources

Quran

The Muslim Mufassir Ibn Kathir's commentary on this verse in his book Tafsir ibn Kathir is as follows:

Hadith
Safiur Rahman Mubarakpuri mentions that this incident is also mentioned in the Sunni hadith collection Sahih al-Bukhari.  mentions: 

It is also mentioned in  that Quran verse  was revealed about this event:

The event is also mentioned in

Biographical literature
This event is mentioned in Ibn Ishaq's biography of Muhammad. Most of the information available about the events is derived from the sira—maghazi traditions (biographical narratives and documentation of military campaigns) of the early centuries of Islam. The general sequence of the events gained consensus early on, as demonstrated in the text of Ibn Ishaq, an early biographer of Muhammad. Accounts of the battle are derived mainly from descendants of the participants. Much of the basic narrative and chronology, according to Robinson, is reasonably authentic, although some of the more elaborate details — such as the exact scale of the Muslim defeat — may be doubtful or difficult to ascertain.

Muslim casualties
Ibn al-Athir gives the names of 85 Muslims killed in the battle of Uhud. Of these, 75 were Medinans (43 from the Banu Khazraj and 32 from the Banu Aws) and 10 were Muhajirun (Emigrants) from Mecca. Moreover, 46 of the 85 martyrs of Uhud had also participated in the earlier battle of Badr. Some the martyrs of Uhud include:
 ‘AbdAllāh bin Jahsh al-Badrī al-Muhājirī
 ‘Amr bin al-Jamūh al-Badrī al-Khazrajī
 Anas bin an-Nadr al-Khazrajī
 Hamza ibn Abdul-Muttalib
 Hanzala bin Abī ‘Āmir al-Awsī
 Mus‘ab bin ‘Umayr al-Badrī al-Muhājirī

Importance in warfare
Muhammad showed his ability as a general by choosing the battlefield of Uhud. He decided according to the will of Muslims to fight in an open country but was aware of the superior mobility of the Meccans. He knew that an encounter in the open country would expose the infantry wings to envelopment and neutralize the Meccan mobility factor

Thus, he decided to hold high ground with Mount Uhud in their rear, which provided security from any attack from the rear. The only approach from which they could be taken from the rear was protected by the deployment of archers.

Modern references
The battle of Uhud is the second of the two main battles featured in Moustapha Akkad's 1976 film centering on the life of Muhammad, Mohammad, Messenger of God. The other battle featured is the battle of Badr. The battle of Uhud is also depicted in the 2004 animated film, Muhammad: The Last Prophet, directed by Richard Rich, and in the 2012 TV series Farouk Omar. The cave in Mount Uhud where Muhammad rested temporarily during the battle has also received recent media attention in the light of proposals by some Salafi scholars for it to be destroyed.

See also
 Abu Dujana
 Umm Hakim
 Hammanah bint Jahsh
 Nusaybah bint Ka'ab
 List of Sahaba
 List of battles of Muhammad
 Muslim–Quraysh War
 Umm Ayman (Barakah) the woman who was present at the Battle of Uhud

References

Books and journals

 
 
 
 
 
 
 
 
 
 Watt, W. Montgomery (1974).  Muhammad: Prophet and Statesman, Oxford University Press 
 

Encyclopedias

External links

The battle of Uhud
What were the reasons of the battle of Uhud?
Abu Ammaar Yasir Qadhi
The Battle of Uhud

Campaigns led by Muhammad
Battles of Khalid ibn Walid
625
620s conflicts
Muhammad in Medina